Omukama Daudi Kasagama Kyebambe IV (c. 1874 - 1928) was the 11th Omukama of Toro from 1891 to his death in 1928.

Toro
Ugandan monarchies
1870s births
1928 deaths
Year of birth uncertain